Cuyuna may refer to:
AMW Cuyuna Engine Company
Cuyuna Country State Recreation Area
Cuyuna 430 - engine
Cuyuna Iron Range Municipally-Owned Elevated Metal Water Tanks
Cuyuna, Minnesota
Cuyuna Range
Cuyuna Scout Camp